Velakkaras are royal guards mentioned in various historical accounts of Sri Lanka. The general prevailing notion is that they were Tamil mercenaries employed by the Sinhala and Tamil kings. They were considered to be loyal to the king, but occasionally rebelled against him as happened during the time of Vijayabahu.

Etymology
"Velam" in Tamil means "the inner court" and probably these guards were elite and guarded the king and his family. Velam also could be the Sanskrit 'aham', both meaning the inner line of defence in a royal set up.

See also
Indian Tamils of Sri Lanka#Historyvellai-kara means time soldiers.vela in tamil have 3 meanings,vel -spear,velai- work,velai- time

References

Anuradhapura period
Polonnaruwa period